Menem is a surname. Notable people with the surname include:

Carlos Menem (1930–2021), President of Argentina from 1989 to 1999
Eduardo Menem (born 1938), Argentine politician, brother of Carlos Menem
Zulema María Eva Menem (born 1970), daughter of Carlos Menem

Spanish-language surnames
Arabic-language surnames